The Borough of Charnwood is a local government district with borough status in the north of Leicestershire, England, which has a population of 166,100 as of the 2011 census. It borders Melton to the east, Harborough to the south east, Leicester and Blaby to the south, Hinckley and Bosworth to the south west, North West Leicestershire to the west and Rushcliffe in Nottinghamshire to the north. It is named after Charnwood Forest, an area which the borough contains much of.

The administrative centre of the borough is located in Loughborough, which is also the district's largest town and its main commercial centre. The town is also the location of Loughborough University. Other notable settlements include Shepshed, Syston, Birstall and Thurmaston.

History
The district of Charnwood was formed on 1 April 1974 as a merger of the municipal borough of Loughborough, the Shepshed urban district and the Barrow upon Soar Rural District. It was then granted borough status on 15 May 1974.

The symbol of Charnwood Borough Council is the fox, historically linked with Leicestershire, and this is also the symbol used by Leicestershire County Council. Charnwood also contains Quorn, which is believed to be the birthplace of fox-hunting.

Geography
To the south it borders the City of Leicester, about 20 km away from Loughborough. There is a moderately urbanised A6 corridor between the two population centres and close to the River Soar, including Quorn, Barrow-on-Soar, Mountsorrel, Birstall, Sileby, Thurmaston, Syston, Queniborough and East Goscote.

To the south of the borough Birstall, Queniborough, Thurmaston and Syston, form part of the Leicester Urban Area, while Quorn and Shepshed (the second largest town in the district), amongst others, might be considered to be part of a Loughborough urban agglomeration.

The highest point is Beacon Hill (248m/814 ft) to the north of the Charnwood Forest 'area of natural beauty' extending WN-west into the National Forest

Political representation

There are two Parliamentary constituencies covering the district. Charnwood is represented by the Conservative Edward Argar MP. Loughborough is represented by the Conservative Party's Jane Hunt.

Demographics
Charnwood is the largest borough by population in Leicestershire, and has the largest school population as well.

Parishes
 Anstey
 Barkby, Barkby Thorpe, Barrow upon Soar, Beeby, Birstall, Burton on the Wolds
 Cossington, Cotes
 East Goscote
 Hathern, Hoton
 Mountsorrel
 Newtown Linford
 Prestwold
 Queniborough, Quorn
 Ratcliffe on the Wreake, Rearsby, Rothley
 Seagrave, Shepshed, Sileby, South Croxton, Swithland, Syston
 Thrussington, Thurcaston and Cropston, Thurmaston
 Ulverscroft
 Walton on the Wolds, Wanlip, Woodhouse, Wymeswold

Freedom of the Borough
The following People, Military Units and Organisations and Groups have received the Freedom of the Borough of Charnwood.

Individuals
 Paula Radcliffe : 28 June 2004.
 Michael Jones: 29 September 2008.
 Lez Cope-Newman: 24 June 2019.

Military Units
 2nd Battalion The Royal Anglian Regiment: 4 September 2006.
 203 (Loughborough) Squadron The 158 (Royal Anglian) Transport Regiment: 15 April 2010.
 The Royal Logistic Corps: April 2010.

Organisations and Groups
 The Leicester City Football Club: 14 September 2021.

References

External links
 Charnwood Borough Council YouTube channel

 
Non-metropolitan districts of Leicestershire
Boroughs in England